Maryam Monsef  (born Monsefzadeh; November 7, 1984) is an Afghan Canadian former politician. She first was elected to represent the riding of Peterborough—Kawartha as a Liberal member the House of Commons of Canada from 2015 and served until October 2021. A member of the 29th Canadian Ministry, she is the former Minister for Women and Gender Equality (previously known as the Minister of Status of Women), sworn in on January 10, 2017, and Minister of Rural Economic Development, sworn in on November 20, 2019. She was previously the Minister of International Development, until November 20, 2019, and Minister of Democratic Institutions and President of the Queen's Privy Council for Canada until January 10, 2017. Monsef was defeated in her riding in the 2021 federal election.

Family and education 
Monsef was born at the Imam Reza Hospital in Mashhad, Iran, to Hazara Afghan parents who had fled during the Soviet–Afghan War, and lived with her family there in childhood, together with periods in Herat, Afghanistan, in 1987–1988 and 1993–1996. Because Iran and Afghanistan (before 2000) followed the principle of jus sanguinis in their respective nationality laws, Monsef was born an Afghan citizen. Her father was killed on the Iran–Afghanistan border while travelling in 1988, although it is unknown whether he was killed by bandits or Soviet troops. Her uncle had, years earlier, vanished along with several roommates while attending the University of Kabul, in circumstances suggested to have been connected to anti-communist political activity. The family struggled in Iran because of low economic and social prospects for Afghan migrants, even though they had legal status as "involuntary migrants" (mohajerin) under Iranian rules in effect prior to 1992. In 1996, during their second return to Herat, her mother opted to move the family to Canada, and the resulting journey involved travelling through Iran, Pakistan, and Jordan.

Upon arrival, the family took up residence in Peterborough, where Monsef's uncle already lived. They relied on the support of several charity organizations, including the YMCA and the Salvation Army. Monsef has continued to raise money for humanitarian activities in Afghanistan.

In 2003, Monsef enrolled at Trent University, from which she graduated in 2010 with a Bachelor of Science in Biology and Psychology. After graduation, from 2011 to 2014, she worked in several public sector positions in the Peterborough area.

In 2019, she announced her engagement to former Liberal member of Parliament Matt DeCourcey.

Political career 
In 2014, Monsef had been offered a job in Afghanistan, but was unable to enter the country because of security concerns. She then went to Iran to work on relief efforts for Afghan refugees, which encouraged her to focus on political endeavours.

Municipal politics 
When Monsef returned to Canada, Monsef ran for Mayor of Peterborough in 2014, finishing a close second.

Federal politics 
Later that same year, she was elected as the Liberal Party candidate in the upcoming federal election. She was elected on October 19, 2015, with 43.8% of the vote.

Cabinet appointments 
Monsef was appointed as Minister of Democratic Institutions in Justin Trudeau's Cabinet on November 4, 2015. She has variously been referred to as the second- or fourth-youngest minister ever appointed to the Cabinet. According to The Hill Times, Monsef was named President of the Queen's Privy Council in Canada although it was unclear at the time whether she had been sworn into that office. Monsef has described this position as "largely ceremonial."  The Parliamentary website subsequently indicated that she had assumed the position on November 4.

Criticism and controversy

Handling of portfolio 
On May 10, 2016, Monsef gave notice in the House of Commons of the government's plans for the composition of the Special Committee on Electoral Reform, which was to have ten members—six members of the Liberal Party, three members from the Conservative Party, and one member from the New Democratic Party.  This attracted immediate controversy, as the government possessed a majority of the committee seats and thus could theoretically recommend alterations to the electoral system without the support of any other party. As well, the Green Party and the Bloc Québécois objected to their lack of voting representation on the committee, although they were invited to attend meetings.

On June 2, 2016, the Liberal government reversed course, and both Trudeau and Monsef advised that they would support Nathan Cullen's motion for the composition of the committee, which would instead have twelve members—five Liberals, three Conservatives, two New Democrats, and one member from each of the Bloc Québécois and the Green Party.

Following the release of the final report of the Electoral Reform Committee Monsef criticized the Members of the committee stating "On the main question on the hard choices that we had asked the committee to make, the members of the committee took a pass," and "We asked the committee to help answer very difficult questions for us. It did not do that." The remarks were considered inaccurate and offensive to the Members of the Committee. Monsef later apologized for her comments.

In late 2016 the Government contracted Vox Pop Labs to create on online survey for Canadians on electoral reform at a website called mydemocracy.ca. The survey was condemned as unscientific and misleading by journalists for allowing unlimited entries from one person and failing to ask direct questions about electoral systems. It was also widely mocked by political observers and electoral reform advocates. Conservative M.P. Scott Reid and Green Party Leader Elizabeth May both claimed the survey looked more like an online dating survey.

In early 2017 Monsef was replaced as Democratic Institutions Minister by Karina Gould and the Liberal campaign promise to replace the first-past-the-post electoral system was not pursued further.

Place of birth 
Monsef has been criticized for stating that she was born in Afghanistan, when in fact she was born in Iran. When this was revealed in September 2016, some commentators pointed out that this could lead to revocation of her Canadian citizenship and potential deportation, while others have criticized the absurdity of the present law or decried the importation of birtherism into Canadian politics. The Trudeau government has regularly revoked citizenship from individuals who had become citizens through fraudulent means – including individuals who came to Canada as children but whose parents had made false claims on their immigration forms. In an interview at that time, former MP Dean Del Mastro said that political workers in the 2014 municipal and 2015 federal campaigns knew she was not born in Afghanistan, but chose not to make an issue of it. Monsef made a request to Immigration, Refugees and Citizenship Canada to update her information.

In October 2016, her office revealed that she had travelled to Iran with pilgrimage visas in an Afghan passport in 2010, 2013 and 2014 in order to visit the Imam Reza shrine in Mashhad. As this type of visa is normally for a single entry to Iran and does not allow a holder to work, her previous admissions that she had crossed over to Afghanistan and back in 2014, together with working with an Iran-based charity at that time, have caught the attention of Iranian authorities. In a 2014 interview in Peterborough, Monsef admitted that she wanted the trip to "remain hush-hush."

Open microphone incident 

In November 2020 Monsef accidentally left her microphone on during vote in the House of Commons while participating virtually on Zoom. As result the camera showed her saying "The question they're going to ask me — how much do I make now? Like 250?" As a Cabinet Minister her annual salary at the time as $269,800.00.

Monsef was criticized for the comments as her salary was more than four times the median wage in her riding and yet she was casually discussing her own salary without knowing it to the nearest $20,000. It was unclear what prompted Monsef to make the comment however her office later released a statement claiming "Due to a technical error a private conversation was broadcasted."

Taliban comments 

On August 25, 2021, during a press conference regarding the Taliban overthrow of the democratically elected government of Afghanistan, Monsef sparked controversy after she referred to Taliban militants as her "brothers" while calling on them to allow safe passage for refugees and stop engaging in genocide and femicide. The Canadian government designates the Taliban as a terrorist organization, which has been responsible for the deaths of 158 Canadian soldiers since 2001. In response to widespread criticism, Monsef stated that Muslims around the world refer to non-family members as brothers and sisters, and that she "believe[s] deeply that the Taliban are a terrorist organization." Many Farsi speakers and Afghans debunked Monsef's premise on the cultural context of calling the Taliban "brothers", and some have even attributed her defeat in 2021 Canadian election to that comment.

Electoral record

Federal

Municipal

Notes

References

External links 

 Official Site
 
 Bio & mandate from the Prime Minister
 Maryam Monsef Twitter account.

1984 births
Living people
Liberal Party of Canada MPs
Members of the House of Commons of Canada from Ontario
People from Peterborough, Ontario
Women members of the House of Commons of Canada
Afghan Muslims
Trent University alumni
Canadian Muslims
Afghan emigrants to Canada
Members of the King's Privy Council for Canada
Members of the 29th Canadian Ministry
Women government ministers of Canada
People from Mashhad
People from Herat
Hazara politicians
21st-century Canadian women politicians
Applicants for refugee status in Canada